Living on 'Hope' (Swedish: Leva på 'Hoppet') is a 1951 Swedish comedy film directed by Göran Gentele and starring Meg Westergren, Ingrid Thulin, Per Oscarsson and Gunvor Pontén. It was shot at the Sundbyberg Studios of Europa Film in Stockholm and on location around the city. The film's sets were designed by the art director Arne Åkermark. At the 1st Berlin International Film Festival it won the Silver Bear (Comedies) award.

Synopsis
Daydreaming theatre student Vivi imagines herself and her friends setting up a travelling theatrical troupe on an old cargo ship named 'Hope' (Hoppet) and enjoying a series of adventures.

Cast
 Meg Westergren as Vivi
 Ingrid Thulin as Yvonne
 Per Oscarsson as Per 
 Gunvor Pontén as Maj-Britt
 Jarl Kulle as Jalle
 Arne Ragneborn as Arne
 Hjördis Petterson as Teacher
 Olav Riégo as Teacher
 Tord Stål as Teacher
 Rudolf Wendbladh as Harry, mayor
 Anna-Lisa Baude as Hilda, mayoress
 Eric Gustafson as Advertising Executive
 Arthur Fischer as Yvonne's Father
 Wiktor Andersson as 	Office clerk 
 Barbro Fleege as 	Office clerk 
 Torsten Lilliecrona as 	Office clerk

References

Bibliography 
 Hjort, Mette & Lindqvist, Ursula. A Companion to Nordic Cinema. John Wiley & Sons, 2016.
 Qvist, Per Olov & von Bagh, Peter. Guide to the Cinema of Sweden and Finland. Greenwood Publishing Group, 2000.

External links

1951 films
1951 comedy films
Swedish comedy films
1950s Swedish-language films
Films directed by Göran Gentele
Swedish black-and-white films
Films set in Stockholm
Films shot in Stockholm
1950s Swedish films